This is a list of Samurai Sentai Shinkenger episodes. Each episode is also titled entirely in kanji, with furigana readings given for each.

Episodes


{| class="wikitable" width="98%"
|- style="border-bottom:8px solid #F16C60"
! width="4%" | Act# !! Title !! Writer !! Original airdate
|-|colspan="4" bgcolor="#e6e9ff"|

The Gallant Appearance of the Five Samurai

|-|colspan="4" bgcolor="#e6e9ff"|

The Stylish Combination

|-|colspan="4" bgcolor="#e6e9ff"|

An Extermination Skill Contest

|-|colspan="4" bgcolor="#e6e9ff"|

Nightly Tears of Sympathy

|-|colspan="4" bgcolor="#e6e9ff"|

The Kabuto Origami

|-|colspan="4" bgcolor="#e6e9ff"|

The Abusive King

|-|colspan="4" bgcolor="#e6e9ff"|

Marlin Fishing

|-|colspan="4" bgcolor="#e6e9ff"|

The Brides are Spirited Away

|-|colspan="4" bgcolor="#e6e9ff"|

The Tiger's Rebellion

|-|colspan="4" bgcolor="#e6e9ff"|

The Great Sky Combination

|-|colspan="4" bgcolor="#e6e9ff"|

A Threefold Strife

|-|colspan="4" bgcolor="#e6e9ff"|

The Very First Super Samurai Combination

|-|colspan="4" bgcolor="#e6e9ff"|

Heavy Cries

|-|colspan="4" bgcolor="#e6e9ff"|

The Foreign Samurai

|-|colspan="4" bgcolor="#e6e9ff"|

The Imposter and the Real Deal's Arrest

|-|colspan="4" bgcolor="#e6e9ff"|

The Power of the Kuroko

|-|colspan="4" bgcolor="#e6e9ff"|

The Sushi Samurai

|-|colspan="4" bgcolor="#e6e9ff"|

Samurai Promotion

|-|colspan="4" bgcolor="#e6e9ff"|

Learning the Samurai Disposition

|-|colspan="4" bgcolor="#e6e9ff"|

The Ebi Origami's Transformation

|-|colspan="4" bgcolor="#e6e9ff"|

The Father and Son Bears

|-|colspan="4" bgcolor="#e6e9ff"|

Lord Butler

|-|colspan="4" bgcolor="#e6e9ff"|

The Rampaging Gedoushu

|-|colspan="4" bgcolor="#e6e9ff"|

The True Samurai Combination

|-|colspan="4" bgcolor="#e6e9ff"|

The Dream World

|-|colspan="4" bgcolor="#e6e9ff"|

Decisive Match Number One

|-|colspan="4" bgcolor="#e6e9ff"|

The Switched Lives

|-|colspan="4" bgcolor="#e6e9ff"|

The Lantern Samurai

|-|colspan="4" bgcolor="#e6e9ff"|

The Runaway Lantern

|-|colspan="4" bgcolor="#e6e9ff"|

The Manipulated Academy

|-|colspan="4" bgcolor="#e6e9ff"|

The Kyoryu Origami

|-|colspan="4" bgcolor="#e6e9ff"|

The Ushi Origami

|-|colspan="4" bgcolor="#e6e9ff"|

The Great Bull King

|-|colspan="4" bgcolor="#e6e9ff"|

Fatherly Love, Girlish Innocence

|-|colspan="4" bgcolor="#e6e9ff"|

The Eleven Origami, The Complete Combination

|-|colspan="4" bgcolor="#e6e9ff"|

The Curry Samurai

|-|colspan="4" bgcolor="#e6e9ff"|

The Epic Glue Battle

|-|colspan="4" bgcolor="#e6e9ff"|

Showdown with the Rifle Squad

|-|colspan="4" bgcolor="#e6e9ff"|

The Very Urgent First Aid Emergency

|-|colspan="4" bgcolor="#e6e9ff"|

The General Heads to the Front Lines

|-|colspan="4" bgcolor="#e6e9ff"|

The Sent Words

|-|colspan="4" bgcolor="#e6e9ff"|

The Two-Hundred Year Long Ambition

|-|colspan="4" bgcolor="#e6e9ff"|

Last Stroke of a Sword

|-|colspan="4" bgcolor="#e6e9ff"|

The Eighteenth Head of the Shiba House

|-|colspan="4" bgcolor="#e6e9ff"|

The Impersonator

|-|colspan="4" bgcolor="#e6e9ff"|

The Showdown Clash

|-|colspan="4" bgcolor="#e6e9ff"|

Bonds

|-|colspan="4" bgcolor="#e6e9ff"|

The Final Great Decisive Battle

|-|colspan="4" bgcolor="#e6e9ff"|

A Samurai Sentai Eternally

|}

References

See also

Samurai Sentai Shinkenger